Seleh Chin or Selehchin may refer to:
 Seleh Chin-e Olya
 Seleh Chin-e Sofla